Aleksandra (Saška) Mojsilović (born 1968) is a Serbian-American scientist. Her research interests are artificial intelligence, data science, and signal processing. She is known for innovative applications of machine learning to diverse societal and business problems. Her current research focuses on issues of fairness, accountability, transparency, and ethics in AI. Mojsilović currently leads Trustworthy AI at IBM Research and is a co-director of IBM Science for Social Good. She is an IBM Fellow and IEEE Fellow.

Education and career 
Mojsilović was born in Belgrade, Serbia. She received her PhD in Electrical Engineering in 1997 from the University of Belgrade, Belgrade, Serbia. From 1997 to 1998, she was an assistant professor at the University of Belgrade. From 1998 to 2000, she was a Member of Technical Staff at the Bell Laboratories, Murray Hill, New Jersey. She joined IBM Research in 2000.

Research 
Mojsilović's research interests include artificial intelligence, machine learning, multi-dimensional signal processing, and data science. She has applied her expertise to diverse application areas, including computer vision, multimedia, recommender systems, medical diagnostics, healthcare, IT operations, business analytics, workforce analytics, drug discovery, disease ecology, and most recently, COVID-19 response. A substantial part of her research is focused on development of ethical, responsible, and beneficial AI systems. In 2015, with Kush Varshney, she created IBM Science for Social Good initiative as a way to promote and direct AI research and development towards applications that benefit humanity. She was among the first researchers to call for transparent reporting on the development and deployment of AI models and systems.

Mojsilović currently leads Trustworthy AI team in IBM Research. The team has created leading open source and product capabilities in support of fair, explainable, robust, transparent, and responsible AI. Most notable contributions include: AI Fairness 360, a toolkit for mitigating bias in machine learning models, AI Explainability 360, a toolkit for supporting explanations in AI models, and AI FactSheets 360, an open research effort to foster trust in AI by increasing transparency and enabling governance.

Awards and recognition 
IEEE Young Author Best Paper Award (2001)
European Conference on Computer Vision Best Paper Award (2002)
Daniel H. Wagner Prize for Excellence in the Practice of Advanced Analytics and Operations Research (2010)
IBM Fellow (2014)
IEEE Fellow (2017)
Computing Community Consortium and Schmidt Futures AI for Good Award (2019)
Belfer Center’s Technology and Public Purpose Project Spotlights Outstanding Technologies for Public Good (2020)
100 Brilliant Women in AI Ethics (2020)
Tech Spotlight (2021)

Personal 
Mojsilović is the creator of the award-winning food blog Three Little Halves, which blends her love of food, photography, and writing. She was nominated for the James Beard Award and received the International Association of Culinary Professionals Award.

Mojsilović serves on the Board of Directors of Neighborhood Trust Financial Partners, which provides financial literacy and economic empowerment training to low-income individuals.

She lives in New York City with her husband and daughter.

References 

IBM people
University of Belgrade School of Electrical Engineering alumni
Scientists from Belgrade
Living people
Fellow Members of the IEEE
Serbian women scientists
Serbian women engineers
1968 births
Artificial intelligence ethicists
IBM Fellows
Women data scientists
20th-century American women
21st-century American women scientists